The Fatti Sentire World Tour (also known as the Hazte Sentir World Tour and the Fatti sentire–Worldwide Tour) was the ninth concert tour by Italian singer Laura Pausini. The tour supported her thirteenth studio album, Fatti sentire (2018). She performed 53 shows in Europe and the Americas.

Background 
After the general rehearsal on 13 July in Jesolo, the tour officially began with two concerts at the Circus Maximus in Rome on 21 and 22 July. After performing in Italy, Pausini started the American tour on 26 July in Miami, United States and ended the American leg on 31 August at the Radio City Music Hall in New York City. After performing in Italy between September and October, she performed in several European countries in October to return to Italy and finish the tour in Eboli. This was the first time that she presented herself in cities like Guayaquil in Ecuador and Brasília and Recife in Brazil. It is also the first time she returned to Guatemala after 21 years of absence. The tour ended officially in Monte Carlo on 31 December 2018.

Opening acts 
Virginio Simonelli 
Edwyn Roberts 
Daniel Vuletic 
Tony Maiello 
Giulia Anania 
Enrico Nigiotti

Setlist 
The following setlist was obtained from the concert held on 21 July 2018, at Circo Massimo in Rome, Italy. It does not represent all shows for the duration of the tour.
"Non è detto
"E.STA.A.TE
Pop medley: "Primavera in anticipo (It Is My Song)" / "La mia risposta" / "Le cose che vivi"
"Frasi a metà
"Incancellabile"
"Simili"
Cosa Radio Finestre medley: "L'ultima cosa che ti devo" / "Con la musica alla radio" / "Le due finestre"
"Resta in ascolto"
Hits medley: "Lato destro del cuore" / "Non ho mai smesso" / "La solitudine"
"Fantastico (Fai quello che sei)"
"La soluzione"
Rock medley: "Ho creduto a me" / "Il caso è chiuso" / "Un'emergenza d'amore"
"Il coraggio di andare"
"E ritorno da te"
"Tra te e il mare"
Acoustic medley: "Limpido" / "Benvenuto" / "Strani amori" / "Non c'è"
"Come se non fosse stato mai amore"
"Vivimi"
Vale Passione Canto medley: "Una storia che vale" / "Benedetta passione" / "Io canto"
"Nuevo"
"Invece no"
Reggaetón medley: "Nadie ha dicho" / "Innamorata / "E.STA.A.TE"

Tour dates

Box office score data

Band 

 Electric guitar and musical direction: Paolo Carta
 Electric and acoustic guitar: Nicola Oliva
 Piano: Fabio Coppini
 Keyboards: Andrea Rongioletti
 Drums: Carlos Hércules
 Bass: Roberto Gallinelli
 Percussion: Ernesto López
 Backing vocalist: Roberta Granà, Gianluigi Fazio, Mónica Hill, Claudia D'Ulisse, David Blank

References

External links 
 Laura Pausini - official website

2018 concert tours
Laura Pausini concert tours